Elections were held in Frontenac County, Ontario on October 27, 2014 in conjunction with municipal elections across the province.

Frontenac County Council
Frontenac County Council consists of the mayors of each of the four constituent municipalities plus an additional councillor from each municipality.

Central Frontenac

Frontenac Islands

North Frontenac

South Frontenac

References
 
Election 2014

Frontenac
Frontenac County